Charles Walter Sandford (11 September 1895 – 22 October 1966) was an Australian politician.

Born in Creswick, Victoria, he received a primary education before becoming a railway worker. He served in the military from 1914 to 1918, and returned as an official with the Australian Railways Union. During World War II he was a public servant.

In 1946 he was elected to the Australian Senate as a Labor Senator for Victoria, taking his seat in 1947. He was defeated in 1955 (taking effect in 1956), but on 6 June 1957 he returned to the Senate, appointed to the casual vacancy caused by the death of Labor Senator Jack Devlin.

In 1966, Sandford fell ill on board a flight from Hong Kong to Sydney, returning from the Inter-Parliamentary Union conference in Tehran; he died on 22 October at the Royal Brisbane Hospital. George Poyser was appointed to replace him.

References

1895 births
1966 deaths
Australian Labor Party members of the Parliament of Australia
Members of the Australian Senate for Victoria
Members of the Australian Senate
20th-century Australian politicians